Henry Robert McAdoo (10 January 1916 – 10 December 1998) was a Church of Ireland clergyman.

He was born in Cork and educated at Cork Grammar School and Mountjoy School in Dublin. He studied modern languages (French and Irish) in Trinity College Dublin, was scholar in 1936 and graduated in 1938.

He was ordained as a deacon in 1939 and as a priest in 1940. He was the incumbent of Castleventry with Ardfield from 1943 to 1948, with Kilmeen from 1947 to 1948, Rector of Kilmocomogue and Rural Dean of Glansalney West and Bere from 1948 to 1952 and Canon of Kilbrittain in Cork Cathedral, and Canon of Donoughmore in Cloyne Cathedral from 1949 to 1952. He served as Dean of Cork 1952–62, Dean of Leighlin, 1962–63; Bishop of Ossory, Ferns and Leighlin 1962–77 and Archbishop of Dublin 1977–85.

He was the first Anglican co-chairman of the Anglican Roman Catholic International Commission. His time as archbishop was cut short by ill-health and he resigned in 1985.

He died on 10 December 1998 at Dalkey, County Dublin and was buried at Kilkenny. He had married Lesley Weir, with whom he had a son and two daughters.

References

External links
Memorial Sermon for Archbishop Henry Robert McAdoo

1916 births
1998 deaths
Anglican archbishops of Dublin
Alumni of Trinity College Dublin
Bishops of Ossory, Ferns and Leighlin
Deans of Cork
Deans of Leighlin
People educated at Cork Grammar School
Scholars of Trinity College Dublin

20th-century Irish Anglican priests